White City is a village in Macoupin County, Illinois, United States. The population was 212 as of the 2020 census.

Geography
White City is located in southeastern Macoupin County at  (39.072429, -89.764128). Interstate 55 runs along the eastern border of the village, with access from Exit 44 (Illinois Route 138). The Interstate runs north  to Springfield, the state capital, and southwest  to St. Louis. IL 138 leads east  to the center of Mount Olive (the mailing address for White City with ZIP Code 62069) and northwest  to Benld.

The village drains west to the valley of Cahokia Creek and southeast to East Creek, its tributary. Cahokia Creek is a west-flowing direct tributary of the Mississippi River.

Demographics

As of the census of 2000, there were 221 people, 90 households, and 56 families residing in the village. The racial makeup of the village was 98.64% White, and 1.36% from two or more races. Hispanic or Latino of any race were 0.45% of the population.

There were 90 households, out of which 28.9% had children under the age of 18 living with them, 41.1% were married couples living together, 14.4% had a female householder with no husband present, and 36.7% were non-families. 32.2% of all households were made up of individuals, and 14.4% had someone living alone who was 65 years of age or older. The average household size was 2.46 and the average family size was 3.11.

In the village, the population was spread out, with 27.1% under the age of 18, 7.2% from 18 to 24, 28.5% from 25 to 44, 20.8% from 45 to 64, and 16.3% who were 65 years of age or older. The median age was 38 years. For every 100 females, there were 95.6 males. For every 100 females age 18 and over, there were 91.7 males.

The median income for a household in the village was $26,000, and the median income for a family was $42,500. Males had a median income of $45,313 versus $16,875 for females. The per capita income for the village was $14,826. About 15.2% of families and 19.3% of the population were below the poverty line, including 36.5% of those under the age of eighteen and 7.1% of those 65 or over.

References

Villages in Macoupin County, Illinois
Villages in Illinois